Ernest L. Jorge (October 7, 1914 – October 6, 1971) was an American football coach.  He served as the head football coach at the College of the Pacific—now known as the University of the Pacific—in Stockton, California from 1951 to 1952, compiling a record of 13–8–1.  Jorge led the Pacific Tigers to consecutive appearances in the Sun Bowl.  Jorge played high school football at Turlock High School in Turlock, California and college football at Saint Mary's College of California.  He began his coaching career at Christian Brothers High School in Sacramento, California and later moved to Modesto High School in Modesto, California.  He joined the coaching staff at Pacific in 1947 as line coach under Larry Siemering.  Jorge was found dead at a Holiday Inn in Kent, Ohio, on October 6, 1971.  He was working as a college scout for the Houston Oilers of the National Football League (NFL) at the time of his death.

Head coaching record

College

References

External links
 

1914 births
1971 deaths
American football guards
Chicago Cardinals coaches
Houston Oilers scouts
Navy Midshipmen football coaches
Oakland Raiders coaches
Pacific Tigers football coaches
Saint Mary's Gaels football players
High school football coaches in California
People from Turlock, California
Players of American football from California